was a Japanese swimmer. She competed in the women's 200 metre breaststroke at the 1936 Summer Olympics.

References

External links
 

1917 births
1940 deaths
Japanese female breaststroke swimmers
Olympic swimmers of Japan
Swimmers at the 1936 Summer Olympics
Place of birth missing